Darevsky's bent-toed gecko (Cyrtodactylus darevskii) is a species of lizard in the family Gekkonidae. The species is endemic to Laos.

Etymology
The specific name, darevskii, is in honor of Russian herpetologist Ilya Darevsky.

Geographic range
C. darevskii is found in central Laos, in Khammouane Province.

Habitat
The preferred natural habitats of C. darevskii are forest, rocky areas, and dry caves.

Description

Reproduction
The mode of reproduction of C. darevskii is unknown.

References

Further reading
Nazarov RA, Poyarkov NA, Orlov NL, Nguyen NS, Milto KD, Martynov AA, Konstantinov EL, Chulisov AS (2014). "A review of genus Cyrtodactylus (Reptilia: Sauria: Gekkonidae) in fauna of Laos with description of four new species". [Proceedings of the Zoological Institute RAS ] 318 (4): 391–423. (Cyrtodactylus darevskii, new species). (in English, with an abstract in Russian).

Cyrtodactylus
Reptiles described in 2014